Success is an unincorporated township in Coös County, New Hampshire, United States. It is located directly to the east of the city of Berlin, and borders on the state of Maine. Success is part of the Berlin, NH–VT Micropolitan Statistical Area.

As of the 2020 census, the township had a population of 4. There are seasonal homes, cabins, and cottages mainly located around Success Pond, which give the township an additional small seasonal population.

As of 2005, one of the larger landowners in Success is the Androscoggin Valley Regional Refuse Disposal District.

History 
The grantees were Benjamin Mackay and about seventy others.

The state of New Hampshire requires a nearby incorporated town to exercise the responsibilities that would fall to the town of Success if it should be incorporated. Some towns in the state bearing such responsibility have sought to be relieved of it.

Blanchard and Twitchell Railroad 
A railroad was built by Blanchard and Twitchell Company in 1892 from the Boston and Maine Railroad in Berlin through the aboriginal forests to Success Pond in the northeast corner of the township. Six locomotives transported lumber and logs to Berlin sawmills over the  railway. Most of the Success township forests were gone within a decade, but the railway operated after 1904 as the George W. Blanchard and Sons Company Railroad, as Cassius M. C. Twitchell had sold his interest in the business in 1901. The Boston and Maine kept  of interchange track in service when the remainder of the railroad was dismantled in 1907.

Geography 
The entire township is part of the Androscoggin River watershed. Success Pond is in the north, and is drained by Chickwolnepy Stream. Stearns Brook drains the center of the township, through its North and South Branches and Meadow Brook. The Mahoosuc Range crosses the southern part of the township, draining north via Horne Brook and Bean Brook, to the west via Cascade Alpine Brook, and to the south by several small brooks, all flowing to the Androscoggin River.

The Appalachian Trail follows the Mahoosuc crest across the township.

Demographics 

As of the 2010 census, there were no people living in the township, although there are a number of summer homes mainly on the shores around Success Pond.

References

Townships in Coös County, New Hampshire
Berlin, New Hampshire micropolitan area
Townships in New Hampshire